Nanovid microscopy, from "nanometer video-enhanced microscopy", is a microscopic technique aimed at visualizing colloidal gold particles of 20–40 nm diameter (nanogold, immunogold) as dynamic markers at the light-microscopic level. The nanogold particles as such are smaller than the diffraction limit of light, but can be visualized by using video-enhanced differential interference contrast (VEDIC). The technique is based on the use of contrast enhancement by video techniques and digital image processing. Nanovid microscopy, by combining small colloidal gold probes with video-enhanced quantitative microscopy, allows studying the intracellular dynamics of specific proteins in living cells.

See also 
 Microscopy
 Single-particle tracking
 Differential interference contrast microscopy
 Microtubule

References 
 De Mey, J., Moeremans, M., Geuens, G., Nuydens, R., De Brabander, M., High resolution light and electron microscopic localization of tubulin with the IGS (immuno-gold staining) method, Cell Biol. Int. Rep. 5, 889-899 (1981). 
 De Brabander M, Nuydens R, Geuens G, Moeremans M, De Mey J., The use of submicroscopic gold particles combined with video contrast enhancement as a simple molecular probe for the living cell, Cell Motil Cytoskeleton. 1986;6(2):105-13.  
 de Brabander, M. Nuydens, R. Ishihara, A. Holifield, B. Jacobson, K. and Geerts, H., Lateral diffusion and retrograde movements of individual cell surface components on single motile cells observed with Nanovid microscopy, J. Cell Biol., 112, 111-124 (1991).
 Degelos SD, Wilson MP, Chandler JE., Nanovid microscopy for assessing sperm membrane changes induced by in vitro capacitating and acrosomal reacting procedures, J Androl. 1994 Sep-Oct;15(5):462-7.
 Geerts H, De Brabander M, Nuydens R, Geuens S, Moeremans M, De Mey J, Hollenbeck P., Nanovid tracking: a new automatic method for the study of mobility in living cells based on colloidal gold and video microscopy, Biophys J. 1987 Nov;52(5):775-82.
 Geerts H, de Brabander M, Nuydens R., Nanovid microscopy, Nature. 1991 Jun 27;351(6329):765-6.
 Kusumi A, Sako Y, Yamamoto M., Confined lateral diffusion of membrane receptors as studied by single particle tracking (nanovid microscopy). Effects of calcium-induced differentiation in cultured epithelial cells, Biophys J. 1993 Nov;65(5):2021-40.

External links
 Quantitative Microscopy

Cell imaging
Microscopy
Laboratory techniques